Gini Koch (born Jeanne Marie Gerrard on January 25, in California), is a science fiction, fantasy, and horror writer based in Phoenix, Arizona. She is best known for the Alien Series (informally known as the "Katherine 'Kitty' Katt" series) novels, published in the United States by DAW Books. She speaks frequently on what it takes to become a successful author and other aspects of writing and the publishing business. She is also the Lead Editor at Raphael's Village, an online, nonpaying ’zine, and is a featured guest columnist, reviewer, and webcaster for Slice of SciFi and It’s Comic Book Day.

Notable works

Writing as Gini Koch

Stand Alone Works 

The Happy Acres Haunted Hotel for Active Seniors (Jun 2013)
Plush Life (Apr 2016)
Sewers (Jul 2015)
A Study in Starlets (Sep 2015) also in alt.sherlock.holmes: New Visions of the Great Detective

The Alien or the Katherine "Kitty" Katt Series

The Necropolis Enforcement Files Series

The Night Beat (June 2012) also in Sensational Six: Action and Adventure in Sci Fi, Fantasy and Paranormal Romance
Night Music (2019?)

Non Fiction 

 Random Musings from the Funny Girl: Or How to Make the Most of Multiple Personality Disorder (Feb 2014)

Writing as G.J. Koch

The Alexander Outland Series

Alexander Outland: Space Pirate (June 2012)

The Martian Alliance Series

The Royal Scam (Sep 2011) also in Alliance Rising
Three Card Monte (Oct 2012) also in Alliance Rising
A Bug's Life (Sep 2015) also in Alliance Rising

Writing as Anita Ensal

Stand Alone Works 

 A Cup of Joe (Nov 2012)

The Neighborhood Series

Contingency Plan (Dec 2011)
Being Neighborly (Apr 2012)

Writing as A.E. Stanton

The New West Series

When Josie Comes Home (Oct 2011)
Deacon's Ark (Dec 2011)

Writing as Jemma Chase

Stand alone works 

Hotter Than Hell (Oct 2011)
The Disciple (Dec 2011)

Anthologies

Accolades 
Touched By an Alien was named one of the Top 10 Science Fiction and Fantasy Novels of 2010 by Booklist.

References

External links
 
 

Year of birth missing (living people)
Living people
Writers from California
Writers from Phoenix, Arizona
21st-century American novelists
American science fiction writers
American women short story writers
American women novelists
Women science fiction and fantasy writers
21st-century American women writers
21st-century American short story writers
Novelists from Arizona